Walter Percy Sladen (30 June 1849 – 11 June 1900) was an English biologist who specialised in starfish.

The son of a wealthy leather merchant, Sladen was born near Halifax, Yorkshire on 30 June 1849. He was educated at Hipperholme Grammar School and Marlborough College, but received no university training. As a young man he indulged his hobby of natural history, but soon become fascinated with echinoderms. In 1876 he was elected a Fellow of the Linnean Society of London, and the following year became a Fellow of the Zoological Society of London. 1877 also saw the publication of his first paper, in which he split the sea-lily genus Poteriocrinus into four; in his lifetime, Sladen would gain a reputation as a "splitter" because of his proclivity for declaring specimens to belong to new genera or species. Late that year he began a long and fruitful collaboration with Duncan; which would see the publication of some 15 co-authored papers, many on fossils, over the course of twelve years.

From December 1878, Sladen spent three month at Naples under the auspices of the British Association for the Advancement of Science. His work there, on echinoderm pedicellariae, established his reputation as a leading authority on echinoderms, and in 1881 he was invited to organise and write up an account of the starfishes collected during the Challenger expedition. This would take him a decade to complete, and comprise nearly 1000 pages and 118 plates.

By 1890, Sladen married Constance Anderson of York. She was sister of Tempest Anderson the volcanologist, and Yarborough Anderson, a barrister.
Her father  William Charles Anderson was a surgeon and Sheriff of York.

By that time Sladen was on the Committee of the British Association for the Advancement of Science, Zoological Secretary of the Linnean Society of London, and also active in the Zoological Society of London and the Geological Society of London. He therefore relocated to London, at least temporarily. Unfortunately much of Sladen's later life was interrupted by poor health. In 1895 he was elected Vice-President of the Linnean Society, but only a few months later he gave up both this and his secretarial position because of health problems. He completed only two more papers before retiring in 1898 to an Exeter estate inherited on the death of his uncle. He died there two years later, on 11 June 1900.

Following his death, Sladen's wife helped preserve her husband's memory by donating his large collection of echinoderms to the Royal Albert Memorial Museum in Exeter, and endowing the Percy Sladen Memorial Trust, to be administered by the Linnean Society to support scientific research.

Honoria
The hatchetfish Argyropelecus sladeni was named after him.

See also
:Category:Taxa named by Percy Sladen

Notes

References
  (alternative; retrieved 2016-12-15)

External links

1849 births
1900 deaths
English zoologists
Fellows of the Geological Society of London
Fellows of the Zoological Society of London
Fellows of the Linnean Society of London
People educated at Marlborough College